Săpânța (or Szaploncza; Slovak: Sapunka; Yiddish: ספינקא or Spinka or Shpinka) is a commune in Maramureș County, Maramureș, Romania,  northwest of Sighetu Marmației and just south of the river Tisza. It is composed of a single village, Săpânța.

It is known for its "Merry Cemetery" and was the original home of the Spinka dynasty of Hasidic Rebbes.

Gallery

References

External links
 Photos of Săpânța
 More about Maramureș and the Merry Cemetery
 New York Times Article: In Merry Cemetery, Romanians' lives in carvings and verse
 Photos of Săpânța-Peri Monastery
 Săpânța - o destinatie surpriză 

Communes in Maramureș County
Localities in Romanian Maramureș
Shtetls